Émile Brugsch (February 24, 1842 – January 14, 1930) was a German Egyptologist whose career spanned the late 19th and early 20th centuries. He is known as the official who "evacuated" the mummies from the Deir el-Bahri Cache in 1881 without recording the plan of the tomb which has fuelled speculation that he was involved in the pilfering of antiquities.  He was assistant curator of the Bulaq Museum - the core element of what is today's Egyptian Museum.

Brugsch was born in Berlin, and was the brother of the Egyptologist Heinrich Karl Brugsch. He assisted author and occultist Aleister Crowley in 1904 by having the Stele of Revealing translated by his assistant. The Stele, and the translation, became integral parts of Crowley's subsequent writing of The Book of the Law and his founding of the philosophical practice and religion of Thelema. He is mentioned in The Temple of Heliopolis by Wm. J. Shaw, whom he assisted with translation of hieroglyphics at the temple.

Brugsch threw on the rubbish heap an arm found in the tomb of Djer which Ancient Egyptians believed was the tomb of Osiris. He has been described as leaving "behind him an evil reputation" through his dealings in Egypt.

Brugsch died in Nice, France, aged 87.

See also 
List of Egyptologists
The Night of Counting the Years (Egyptian movie, 1969)

References

External links

 Giants of Egyptology: 9th of a Series - The Brothers Brugsch , accessed December 28, 2006
 Overland monthly and Out West, The Temple of Heliopolis [Volume 14, Issue 5, May 1875; pp. 438–444]

1842 births
1930 deaths
Archaeologists from Berlin
German Egyptologists
German male non-fiction writers